Florin Mina (July 3, 1959 – 2006) was a Romanian former volleyball player who competed in the 1980 Summer Olympics.

He was born in Tulcea.

In 1980 he was a squad member of the Romanian team which won the bronze medal in the Olympic tournament.

External links
IOC database
europafm.ro 

1959 births
2006 deaths
Romanian men's volleyball players
Olympic volleyball players of Romania
Volleyball players at the 1980 Summer Olympics
Olympic bronze medalists for Romania
Olympic medalists in volleyball
Medalists at the 1980 Summer Olympics
People from Tulcea